Rehan Iqbal Alikhan (born 28 December 1962) is a British-born former cricketer of Pakistani descent. He was a right-handed batsman and an occasional off-break bowler. He was born in Westminster, London.

Alikhan's cricketing career began in 1986 for Sussex with a debut against Cambridge University, and he then retained his place in the side for the rest of the season, playing largely as an opening batsman.

At the end of 1986 Alikhan went to Pakistan to play for Pakistan International Airlines, where he debuted in the Patron's Trophy and played in the Final of the PACO Cup, which his team won by a ten-run margin. Alikhan returned to England for the 1987 season, and was again a regular in the Sussex side. Used less frequently in 1988, he moved at the end of the season to Surrey for 1989.

For Surrey, Alikhan scored the only two centuries of his career in his final two matches of the 1990 season, against Middlesex and Essex. He had his best season in 1991, scoring 1055 runs, though not making any further centuries. However, he played just one County Championship game during 1992, and 1993 was his final season in England; he moved back to play with the Pakistan National Shipping Corporation for the 1993–94 season, where he lasted for two years before giving up the game.

References 

1962 births
English cricketers
British Asian cricketers
Living people
English people of Pakistani descent
Pakistan International Airlines cricketers
Sussex cricketers
Surrey cricketers
Pakistan National Shipping Corporation cricketers
British sportspeople of Pakistani descent
Pakistani cricketers